Al-Ahram Canadian University (ACU) is a private university in 6th of October City, Egypt. It was established by Al-Ahram Egyptian daily newspaper. It includes a Faculty of Pharmacy, School of Business, Faculty of Computer and Information Technology, Faculty of Mass Communication, Faculty of Oral and Dental Medicine and Faculty of Engineering. The university also runs specialized centers including Center of Excellence, the Educational Center of Dental Medicine, Center of Media Studies, Research Center for Administrative and Economic Studies, Research Center and Consultancy in Information Technology and Consultancy Center in Pharmaceutical Services.

Faculty of Engineering 
The faculty consists of the following departments:
Construction Engineering Department.
Architectural Engineering Department.
Electrical Engineering Department:
Electrical Power Engineering & Machines Division
Electronics Engineering & Communucations Division
Computer Engineering Division
Mechanical Engineering Department:
Mechanical Power Engineering Division
Production Engineering & Mechanical Design Divisin
Mechatronics Engineering Division

See also 
 Université Française d'Égypte
 American University in Cairo
 British University in Egypt
 List of Egyptian universities

References

External links
 Official website

Universities in Egypt
Educational institutions established in 2005
2005 establishments in Egypt